Marcel Jousse (28 July 1886 – 14 August 1961) was a French Jesuit and anthropologist.

References

1886 births
1961 deaths
Chevaliers of the Légion d'honneur
French anthropologists
19th-century French Jesuits
20th-century French Jesuits
20th-century anthropologists